The Invisible Guest is a 2016 Spanish mystery thriller film written and directed by Oriol Paulo. It was released in Spain on 6 January 2017. The film opened to lukewarm critical response, but was a commercial success, grossing $30.7 million against its €4 million budget.

The Invisible Guest has spawned four remakes in different languages.

Plot

Spanish businessman Adrián Doria is out on bail after being arrested for the murder of his lover, Laura Vidal. His lawyer, Félix Leiva, hires defense attorney Virginia G, who visits him at his apartment with the news that the prosecutor has found a witness who will be testifying in front of a judge soon; they have three hours to come up with a defense, so Virginia urges her client to tell her the whole truth.

Adrián tells Virginia how he and Laura ended their affair months ago but received a call blackmailing them to come to a rural hotel with €100,000. At the hotel, Adrián was knocked unconscious and awoke to find Laura dead in the bathroom. With the door and the windows locked from inside the police found Adrián to be the only suspect.

Adrián then narrates further back, how he claimed to be in Paris but was really in a cabin with Laura. As they drive back to Barcelona, Adrián swerves to avoid a deer, clipping another car, which hits a tree. Although they are unhurt, the driver of the other car, a bank employee named Daniel Garrido, 23, is killed. Laura rationalizes that it is not entirely their fault since Daniel was texting and not wearing his seat belt. When another car approaches, Laura pushes Daniel's body down across the passenger's seat, and she and Adrián pretend to exchange insurance information. She pretends to answer Daniel's phone when it rings to continue the ruse, and the other driver leaves, convinced. Laura waits for a tow truck in Adrián's car, which will not start, while Adrián dumps Daniel's car in a lake with his body in the trunk.

Later on, Laura, upset, picks up Adrián in the vicinity of the lake and tells him how his car was repaired. An automotive engineer, Tomás, drove by and offered to help Laura, who claimed she'd hit a deer. He towed Adrian's car to his (Tomás's) house to fix it. While talking to Tomás's wife, Elvira, Laura saw some family photographs and realized Daniel Garrido was their son. When Laura was about to leave in Adrian's car, she adjusted the driver's seat arousing Tomás's suspicion as to the identity of the driver. After Adrián sells his car and reports it stolen, he parts ways with Laura, hopefully for good.

Within a few days, Adrián is summoned to the police station, as Tomás has reported his plate number to the police. Félix arranges for a false alibi for Adrián in Paris, and bribes the police to remove Adrián's name from the Garrido case file. When the news report that Daniel is on the run after embezzling money from the bank, Adrián confronts Laura, who admits that she took Daniel's wallet when they put his body in the trunk, and later hacked into Daniel's account and stole the money. Adrián tells her that what she did is wrong, but Laura threatens to frame him too.

Adrián is named European Businessman of the Year, and Tomás poses as a reporter during the ceremony to confront him. Tomás notices that Adrián pulls out the same cigarette lighter he saw when fixing the car. He begs Adrián to tell him where his son's body is in order to bury him as security removes Tomás. Days later, Adrián receives a photo of a lake with instructions to take Laura to the rural hotel with €100,000. Adrián thinks the blackmailer may be the driver they saw driving by just after the accident, if he followed Adrián as he dumped the car into the lake.

Back in the present, Virginia suggests that, in order to save himself, Adrián could claim he saw the face of the man who hit him in the rural hotel room and that the attacker was Tomás. Adrián then reveals he has always known it was Tomás, as he did see his face, but he didn't say it because he was testing Virginia.

Virginia suggests planting an item belonging to Laura in the trunk of Daniel's car (with Daniel's body in it), and claiming she acted alone. Adrián then confesses that as he was pushing the car into the lake, Daniel woke up, as he was only unconscious; an autopsy would reveal he drowned. Virginia is visibly shocked, yet she states she will not reveal this to the judge.

Virginia says Laura's medical records show she was suffering from anxiety, likely from a guilty conscience, and suggests Adrián is making it seem like Laura was the mastermind behind their deceit. However, Virginia says she believes Tomás framed him because Elvira (Tomás's wife) works at the rural hotel where Laura's body was found, and that's why the Garridos chose that place for the rendezvous: Elvira could have easily unlocked the window for her husband to escape after killing Laura, and later locked the window, making it seem like nobody else came in. Virginia says Tomás has been stalking him (Adrián), Félix and even herself, and points to an apartment across the street, where Tomás is lurking. She continues to push Adrián, who finally admits that he killed Laura and staged the scene.

Félix phones and leaves a message on Adrián's home voicemail, urging him to call back as he was unable to reach him on his cellphone. Virginia suggests he return Félix's call as they take a quick break. She exits the apartment with great urgency. Adrián meanwhile calls Félix: Félix again says to Adrián that he could not get a hold of him and informs him that the prosecution's witness is indeed the other driver, but his silence was successfully bought. As Félix questions how the meeting with Virginia is going, the call is getting disturbed with high pitched tones, Adrián then realizes that their entire conversation is being recorded. He recalls Virginia turning off his phone previously, most probably so the cellphone signal would not disrupt the recording. He looks into the apartment across the street and sees Tomás standing next to Virginia, who reveals herself to be Elvira Garrido in disguise. Using the confession Elvira coerced from Adrián, Tomás calls the police as the real Virginia Goodman arrives at Adrián's apartment.

Cast 
 Mario Casas as Adrián Doria, successful businessman, husband and father
 Bárbara Lennie as Laura Vidal, Adrián's lover
 Iñigo Gastesi as Daniel Garrido Ávila, 23-year-old banker
 Francesc Orella as Félix Leiva, Adrián's attorney
 Blanca Martínez as Virginia Goodman, defense attorney hired by Félix
 José Coronado as Tomás Garrido, Daniel's father
 Ana Wagener as Elvira Garrido, Daniel's mother
 Manel Dueso as Inspector Milán
 San Yélamos as Sonia, Adrián's wife
 David Selvas as Bruno, Laura's husband
 Paco Tous as Conductor

Filming
The film was shot in 2015 (from March 10, 2015 to July 12, 2015), in Terrassa, a city in Catalonia, Spain, and in other locations in Spain, such as the city of Barcelona, the region of Biscay, and Vall de Núria.

Reception

Remakes 
 The Italian-language film Il testimone invisibile (2018) is a remake of this film.
 The Indian Hindi language film Badla (2019), starring Amitabh Bachchan and Taapsee Pannu, is a remake of this film.
 The Indian Telugu language film Evaru (2019), starring Adivi Sesh and Regina Cassandra, is loosely inspired by the film.
 2022 Korean language film Confession, starring So Ji-Sub and Yunjin Kim, is a remake of this film.

References

External links
 

2016 films
2016 crime thriller films
2010s mystery thriller films
Films about infidelity
Films about murder
Fiction with unreliable narrators
Films scored by Fernando Velázquez
Films shot in Barcelona
Spanish crime thriller films
Spanish mystery thriller films
Nostromo Pictures films
Atresmedia Cine films
Warner Bros. films
Films directed by Oriol Paulo
2010s Spanish-language films
2010s Spanish films